Louisiana is a lost 1919 American silent comedy film directed by Robert G. Vignola and written by Frances Hodgson Burnett and Alice Eyton. The film stars Vivian Martin, Robert Ellis, Noah Beery, Sr., Arthur Allardt, Lillian West and Lillian Leighton. The film was released on July 20, 1919, by Paramount Pictures.

Plot
It is a comedic love story.

Cast
Vivian Martin as Louisiana Rogers
Robert Ellis as Laurence Ferol
Noah Beery, Sr. as Lem Rogers
Arthur Allardt as Cass Floyd
Lillian West as Olivia Ferol
Lillian Leighton as Aunt Cassandry

References

External links 

 
 

1919 films
1910s English-language films
Silent American comedy films
1919 comedy films
Paramount Pictures films
Films based on works by Frances Hodgson Burnett
Lost American films
Films directed by Robert G. Vignola
American black-and-white films
American silent feature films
1919 lost films
Lost comedy films
1910s American films